Yokneam or Jokneam can refer to:
Yokneam Illit, city in northern Israel
Yokneam Moshava, rural settlement in northern Israel
Tel Yokneam, archeological site associated with the biblical city of Yokneam